The Journals of the Continental Congress are official records from the first three representative bodies of the original United Colonies and ultimately the United States of America. The First Continental Congress was formed and met on September 5 to October 26, 1774, at Carpenters' Hall in Philadelphia, Pennsylvania, early in the American Revolution. Its purpose was to address "intolerable acts" and other infringements imposed on the colonies by the British Parliament. On October 20, 1774, it passed the Continental Association, and it ultimately formed the Second Continental Congress in May 1775 which, through 1781, was responsible for the Declaration of Independence and many critical articles establishing the United States of America. The Congress of the Confederation (1781–1789) immediately succeeded it after ratification of the Articles of Confederation and lasted through the end of the War for American Independence till 1789.

These are the important papers, letters, treaties, reports and assorted records—famous and obscure—relating to the formation of the United States government. While they contain exceedingly important reports, many of which may be well-known, they also contain much covering the day-to-day government of a fledgling country.

The Library of Congress published a complete edition of these papers titled Journals of the Continental Congress between 1904 and 1937. This 34-volume edition was edited by Worthington C. Ford.

See also
Charles Thomson, secretary of the three Congresses
List of delegates to the Continental and Confederation congresses
 Syng inkstand
 Founding Fathers of the United States
 Bibliography of the American Revolutionary War

References

Sources
 
National Archives Information on the Papers of the Continental Congress
 Revolutionary War Papers (including Continental Congress records)

Journals of the Continental Congress at the Library of Congress
 Journals at archive.org:
 Contemporary and early printings
 Secret journals (first published in the 1820s)
 Library of Congress edition (1904-1937)

Continental Congress
Documents of the American Revolution